Hylton Red House, known locally just as Red House (often spelled as Redhouse), is a suburb in the north east of Sunderland, England, situated between Downhill to the west and Marley Pots and Witherwack to the east.

The area, Hylton Red House, is one of the largest council housing schemes in England. In common with most estates in Sunderland, the street names all start with the same letter - 'R' in the case of Red House.

The whole of the estate falls within the SR5 postal code.

Red House is home to Red House Academy (on the site of the original Hylton Red House Comprehensive School), which was the third biggest school in Britain at one point educating over 3500 students. The school was eventually demolished in 2008 after finishing in the lowest 1% of schools in the U.K for 19 years concurrently. Northern Saints VA Primary school, (on the site of the original Hylton Red House Primary school) and English Martyrs Roman Catholic Primary School. Bishop Harland Church of England Primary school was closed down.

Pubs in Hylton Red House include Red House Workman's Club, The Last Orders (formally The Shipwrights Arms), Heppies Club (formally Hepworth & Grandage Club) and The Red House Community Centre.

External links
 Map of Hylton Red House
 Sassco: Website of a team which plays within Red House

City of Sunderland suburbs
Sunderland